The men's shot put (F38) at the 2018 Commonwealth Games, as part of the athletics programme, took place in the Carrara Stadium on 11 April 2018. The event was open to para-sport athletes competing under the F37 / F38 classifications.

Records
Prior to this competition, the existing world records were as follows:

Schedule
The schedule was as follows:

All times are Australian Eastern Standard Time (UTC+10)

Results
With eight entrants, the event was held as a straight final.

Final

References

Men's shot put (F38)